Tosun is a remote controlled armored wheel loader developed in Turkey for combat engineering missions. It is manufactured by Best Group and is in use by the Turkish Army and Turkish Police.

 Power : 225 HP/168 kW
 Speed : 40 km/hr
 Steering System : Articulated
 Articulated Rotation Angle : 40º
 Bucket capacity : 3,5 m3
 Technical dimensions : 3000 x 8000 x 3690 mm
 Weight : 23.240 kg
 Fuel capacity : 300 lt
 Bucket Width : 3000 mm

History
The armored wheel loader was developed by the Ankara-based defense company Best Group in cooperation with the heavy equipment manufacturer Çukurova Makina from Mersin in 2015. The need for such construction equipment arose when removing the barricades and filling up the trenches built in 2015 by militants linked to the banned Kurdistan Workers' Party (PKK) in some residential areas in southeastern Turkey, such as in Yüksekova, Hakkari, Nusaybin, Mardin, and Sur, Diyarbakır. Attacks of militants with rocket-propelled grenades to the loader operator during the operation led to the initially armored-only vehicle being developed as an unmanned, remote-controlled vehicle.

Description
Tosun has eight situational awareness camera systems, enabling the operation of the unmanned equipment in residential areas without direct sight.

As of the end of February 2018, there were a total of 85 Tosun in use.

Use
Tosun vehicles were used during the building of the Syria–Turkey barrier, the Operation Euphrates Shield, and Operation Idlib Shield. In the ongoing Operation Olive Branch, 43 Tosun vehicles are in use.

At the end of February 2018, it was reported that the United States and the United Arab Emirates showed interest in importing Tosun, which cost a sixth of that of similar vehicles deployed in the United States and Israel.

References

Military vehicles of Turkey
Motor vehicles manufactured in Turkey
Military engineering vehicles
Armoured vehicles
Unmanned ground combat vehicles of Turkey